Harzandat-e Sharqi Rural District is in the Central District of Marand County, East Azerbaijan province, Iran. At the National Census of 2006, its population was 4,527 in 1,329 households. There were 4,022 inhabitants in 1,338 households at the following census of 2011. At the most recent census of 2016, the population of the rural district was 3,389 in 1,197 households. The largest of its 12 villages was Harzand-e Jadid, with 841 people.

References 

Marand County

Rural Districts of East Azerbaijan Province

Populated places in East Azerbaijan Province

Populated places in Marand County